Bashiru Aremu (born July 7, 1974) is a Nigerian academician and professor of computer science, Information and Communication Technology.

Early life and education
Bashiru Aremu was born on July 7, 1974, in Iwo's Ancient City in Osun State, Nigeria, West Africa. He holds two undergraduate degrees: a Bachelor of Science Degree in Computer Science with distinctions first class (2002) from Adam Smith University of America and a Bachelor of Technology Degree in Information Technology with distinctions first class (2003) from Business University of Costa Rica. He continued his study in Computer Science, Information and Technology and obtained a dual Doctor of Philosophy (PhD). He received a PhD in Computer Science (2007) from Adam Smith University in the US. In 2008 he also obtained a PhD in Information Technology from the Business University of Costa Rica, which was confirmed by the Federal Government of Nigeria through the Federal Ministry of Education, Evaluation and Accreditation Department as Internationally accredited in Costa Rica with Reference Number FME/S/174/C.2/A/111/206/4312. He obtained quadruple Post-Doctoral Degrees. Firstly, Post Doctorate Degree of Doctor of Science (2013), secondly Grand PhD in Information Technology (2014), both from the West Coast University, US. He obtained the third Post Doctorate Degree of Doctor (2015) from Maha Satra University of Satra Angor Institute, the kingdom of Cambodia.  His research thesis was on General Examination of E-Business in the Modern World of Information Communication. In 2020 he did the fourth Post-Doctoral degree thesis and ad eundem Regular Higher Degree of Doctor of Science in Bioinformatics from Ballsbridge University at Roseau South Dominica, West Indies.

Academic and career
As of March 2021, Aremu is the Vice-chancellor of The Crown University International Chartered Inc and affiliates worldwide in Africa. He was appointed to hold the Institutions' various positions as follows: Board of Trustees, Chartered Intl. Da Vinci University, the Vice-Chancellor and the Vice Chairman International Affairs of Board of Trustees, West Coast University at the United States of America and partner campuses worldwide  Vice President International Affairs of Board of Trustees, Sastra Angkor University Kingdom of Cambodia at Asia and partner campuses worldwide, Deputy Director-General for Africa and Research Professor at International Biographical Centre, Cambridge, England at Europe, World Grand Chancellor, Chartered World Order of Knights of Justice of Peace (worldwide) World Grand President, International Chartered World Learned Society (worldwide) World Grand President, Africa International Institute for Professional Training and Research Intl Chartered and Chairman Board of Peacebuilding and Human Development Centre.

Memberships 
Aremu is a board member of the International Human Rights Commission, a member Senate, Niger Delta University, Wilberforce Island, Bayelsa State, 2014- 2016; member, College of Pure and Applied Science, Crown University College, Ghana and Affiliated Campuses Worldwide 2015- 2016, member Chivalric Sovereign Order of the Knights of Justice, Committee member of International Professional Association of Computer Science and Information Technology on the development of International I.T Education Curriculum Standard for schools, 2015. Senior Member, International Association of Computer Science and Information Technology, Singapore, 2009, official member of Association for Computing Machinery, New York, US, 2006, member, Science Teachers Association of Nigeria (STAN) Osun State Chapter, 2006, charter Member, Computer Science Teachers Association (CSTA) of New York USA, 2006. Member, Institute of Treasury Management (ITM), 2004. 

Aremu was appointed as a member of Board of Trustees, World Sustainable Development Goals Organization, a Chairman Board of Trustees, St James College, Sierra Leone, a Chairman Board of Trustees of Tanko Ribah College of Education, Kebbi Satate, Nigeria and appointed as a Chairman Board of Trustees, Mahawai College of Business, Science and Technology, Ribah, Kebbi State, Nigeria.

Publications/lectures

Lectures 
In 2022, Aremu was invited by Federal Government of Nigeria to  give a lecturer on Economics Implications on National Treasury.

In 2021, Aremu was invited by the International Association of Universities to deliver a lecture at the Six and final Lecture on Innovative Education for Unshaped Futures (IE4UF).

Articles 
Aremu, Bashiru (2022). IPR plays key role in documenting rural knowledge, experts opined. Enewstime PaperPUBLICATIONS

Awards and honours
 In 2022, Aremu received a recognized certificate of Cy-ber Security Pledge by Indian government 
 In 2022, Aremu received Tiger award from United Nature International Peace.
 In 2021, Aremu won an International Research Awards on Science, Technology and Management 
 In 2021, Aremu was awarded with a certificate of recognition by The UN ECOSOC, Human Rights Education Federation of the IHRC, Geneva, Switzerland 
 In 2021, Aremu received Excellence Service Award International Scientist 
 In 2021, Aremu was awarded as Most Academy Excellent World Acclaimed Distinguished Professor Emeritus by Noble INT'L University USA and Canada Partners West Coast INT'L University of Sciences Technology Management and Arts
 2020 World Acclaimed Distinguished Professor Emeritus Award, Faculty of Education, University of Nigeria
 2019 A highest UNESCO Laureate for an outstanding creative and intellectual achievement
 2015  The International Shakespeare Award for Literary Achievement (Iconic Achievers) by International Biographical Centre, Cambridge, England
 2015  Outstanding Scientist of the 21st Century by International Academy for Science and Research, England and Wales
 2015  International Order of Distinction by the Chartered World Order of the Knights of Justice of Peace
 2015  Outstanding Speaker Award by Africa International Institute for Professional Training and Research Intl Chartered
 2015  Salute to Greatness Award by International Chartered World Learned Society
 2015  21st Century Achievement Award by Africa International Institute for Professional Training and Research Intl Chartered

References

Nigerian computer scientists
UNESCO Science Prize laureates
Living people
1974 births